Petr Filipský (born 9 July 1985) is a Czech footballer, who plays as a midfielder. He currently plays for KFC Komárno.

External links
 

1985 births
Living people
Czech footballers
Czech First League players
1. FC Slovácko players
FK Drnovice players
1. HFK Olomouc players
KFC Komárno players
MŠK - Thermál Veľký Meder players
3. Liga (Slovakia) players
4. Liga (Slovakia) players
Czech expatriate sportspeople in Slovakia
Expatriate footballers in Slovakia
Association football midfielders